The aguja skate (Bathyraja aguja) is a species of skate in the family Arhynchobatidae. Little is known about this fish. It has not been collected since its discovery in the open seas off the coast of Peru in 1904.

References

Bathyraja
Fish of Peru
Fish described in 1912
Taxa named by William Converse Kendall
Taxa named by Lewis Radcliffe 
Taxonomy articles created by Polbot